Kirillovo is a rural locality (a village) and the administrative centre of Kirillovsky Selsoviet, Ufimsky District, Bashkortostan, Russia. The population was 773 as of 2010. There are 11 streets.

Geography 
Kirillovo is located 29 km northeast of Ufa (the district's administrative centre) by road. Taush is the nearest rural locality.

References 

Rural localities in Ufimsky District